Plains Creek is a stream in the U.S. state of South Dakota.

Plains Creek was named for the plain terrain along its course.

See also
List of rivers of South Dakota

References

Rivers of Fall River County, South Dakota
Rivers of South Dakota